Anita Bulath (born 20 September 1983) is a Hungarian handballer.

Career

Club
She learned the basics of handball on the famous youth academy of Győri ETO KC, but she did not make any appearances for the team and in 1998 she was eventually transferred to Dunaferr. She made her senior debut in her new team in 2000, and won all possible domestic competitions during her spell at the club (3 championship, 2 cup titles). Her excellent performances caught the eyes of many major clubs and finally FCK Håndbold managed to secure her services. However, she left the club just after one season to join Zdravko Zovko-led Podravka Koprivnica.

She became an important member of her new club, having achieved a back-to-back triumph both in the Croatian Championship and Croatian Cup in 2008 and 2009. They also enjoyed a good run in EHF Cup Winners' Cup in 2008, where they only got knocked out in the semifinals by Larvik HK, which went to win the title that year. In August 2009, Podravka announced that due to the growing financial troubles of the club they cannot allow the high salaries, and they decided to release all foreigner players from the club to cut the wage bills.

Bulath found her new home in Debrecen and quickly established herself as a key player. She played an important role in the 2010–11 EHF Champions League campaign, when Debreceni VSC reached the group stage of the competition for the first time in the club's history.

International
She made her international debut on 2 March 2004, however she has not been selected for a major tournament until the 2008 European Championship. Since then she is a regular member of the team, having played on the 2009 World Championship and being the second best scorer of Hungary on the 2010 European Championship

Achievements
Nemzeti Bajnokság I:
Winner: 2001, 2003, 2004
Silver Medallist: 2010, 2011
Magyar Kupa:
Winner: 2002, 2004
Silver Medallist: 2011
Croatian Championship:
Winner: 2008, 2009
Croatian Cup:
Winner: 2008, 2009
EHF Cup
Winner: 2016
Junior World Championship:
Silver Medallist: 2001, 2003
Junior European Championship
Silver Medallist: 2002
European Championship:
Bronze Medalist: 2012

References

External links
Career statistics on Worldhandball.com

1983 births
Living people
Hungarian female handball players
Sportspeople from Dunaújváros
Expatriate handball players
Hungarian expatriates in Denmark
Hungarian expatriates in Croatia
Viborg HK players
RK Podravka Koprivnica players